Astanlı (also, Astanly) is a village and municipality in the Neftchala Rayon of Azerbaijan.  It has a population of 965.

References 

Populated places in Neftchala District